The 2004–05 Ukrainian First League was the 14th since its establishment. Eighteen teams competed in the competition.

The competition began on July 17, 2004 with six matches. The competition had a winter break and resumed March 19, 2005.

Teams

Promoted teams 
Two clubs promoted from the 2003-04 Ukrainian Second League.
Group A
 FC Hazovyk-Skala Stryi – champion (debut)
Group B
 FC Dynamo-Ihroservis Simferopol – champion (debut)
Group C
 FC Stal Dniprodzerzhynsk – champion (debut)

Relegated teams 
One club was relegated from the 2003-04 Ukrainian Top League:
 FC Karpaty Lviv – 15th place (debut)

Renamed teams 
 Before the start of season, FC Krasyliv-Obolon Krasyliv merged with lower league FC Podillya Khmelnytskyi and changed its name to FC Podillya Khmelnytskyi, while the lower league clubs was dissolved.
 Before the start of season, FC Nafkom-Akademia Irpin was relocated and changed its name to FC Nafkom Brovary.
 Before the start of season, FC Naftovyk Okhtyrka changed its name to FC Naftovyk-Ukrnafta Okhtyrka.
 At the end of season, FC Spartak-Horobyna Sumy changed its name to FC Spartak Sumy.

Location 
In 2004-05 season, the Ukrainian First League consists of the following teams:

Final table 

 FC Polissya Zhytomyr became insolvent during the mid season winter break and the UFF awarded technical victories against them in the second half of the season.

Top scorers 
Statistics are taken from here.

References

External links 
  Persha Liha at Official Site of the Professional Football league of Ukraine

Ukrainian First League seasons
2004–05 in Ukrainian association football leagues
Ukra